Hoseynabad-e Olya may refer to:

Hoseynabad-e Olya, Anbarabad, Kerman Province
Hoseynabad-e Olya, Rafsanjan, Kerman Province
Hoseynabad-e Olya, Kohgiluyeh and Boyer-Ahmad
Hoseynabad-e Olya, Lorestan
Hoseynabad-e Olya, Mazandaran